Éric Naulleau (born 11 March 1961) is a French literary critic, editor, essayist and columnist. He is best known for his appearances on television shows such as On n'est pas couché (2007–2011), hosted by Laurent Ruquier on Saturdays at 11 p.m. on France 2, Balance ton post ! (2018–present), hosted by Cyril Hanouna on Thursdays at 9:15 p.m. on C8, as well as alongside Éric Zemmour on Zemmour et Naulleau (2011–2021), hosted by Anaïs Bouton on Wednesdays at 8:45 p.m. on Paris Première.

References

Living people
1961 births
People from Baden-Baden
Paris Nanterre University alumni
French television personalities
French male essayists
French editors
French literary critics
French columnists
French translators